Oleksiy Bashtanenko (born 16 March 1994) is a Ukrainian professional football goalkeeper who plays for Nikopol.

Career
Bashtanenko is a product of Youth Sportive School #2 Dnipropetrovsk (first trainer was Vadym Matyash) and FC Dnipro Youth Sportive School Systems (first trainers were Oleksiy Chystyakov and Serhiy Maksymych).

From 2011, after graduation from the youth sportive school, he played in the FC Dnipro Dnipropetrovsk reserves. In the main-team squad Bashtanenko made his debut as a start-squad player in the match against FC Zirka Kropyvnytskyi on 17 September 2016 in the Ukrainian Premier League.

References

External links
 
 

1994 births
Living people
Footballers from Dnipro
Ukrainian footballers
FC Dnipro players
FC Dnipro-2 Dnipropetrovsk players
FC Hirnyk-Sport Horishni Plavni players
FC Nikopol players
Ukrainian Premier League players

Association football goalkeepers
Ukrainian First League players
Ukrainian Second League players
Ukraine youth international footballers